Bally Sports North is an American regional sports network owned by Diamond Sports Group, and operates as a Bally Sports affiliate. The channel broadcasts coverage of sporting events involving teams located in the Upper Midwest region, with a focus on professional and collegiate sports teams based in Minnesota.

The network maintains production studios and offices located in downtown Minneapolis, which are shared with production and office operations of Bally Sports Wisconsin, which formerly served as a subfeed of Fox Sports North until it was spun off into a separate channel in 2006.

Bally Sports North is available on cable providers throughout Minnesota, western Wisconsin, northern Iowa, North Dakota, and South Dakota; it is available nationwide on satellite via DirecTV.

History

Origins

The channel originated sometime in 1982 as WCCO II, a local cable channel owned by Midwest Radio and Television (later Midwest Communications), and created as a project by CBS affiliate WCCO-TV (channel 4, now an owned-and-operated station of the network) that broadcast a slate of local and general entertainment programming. On March 1, 1989, it was relaunched as the Midwest Sports Channel. It was also the same year that the network would acquire rights to Twins broadcasts.

MSC's main draws in its early days were games from the Minnesota Twins and Minnesota North Stars. The channel also served as an affiliate of SportsChannel America, filling much of its broadcast day with a mix of national programs and paid programming from the channel, and incorporated sports news tickers provided by the channel. MSC was largely considered a premium channel until the early 1990s, and did not even have full cable coverage in the Minneapolis–St. Paul metropolitan area until it was added by Continental Cablevision's St. Paul system on its expanded basic cable lineup in 1994.

During the North Stars' 1991 Stanley Cup Playoff run, Midwest Sports Channel declined to exercise an option to carry the North Stars' home games (as the SportsChannel America package which MSC carried did not include rights to in-market home games). Instead the North Stars cut a revenue-sharing deal with a group of 11 cable companies to televise the games as a pay-per-view events at a then very expensive price of $12.95 a game.

The following season the North Stars parted ways with Midwest Sports Channel and instead signed a new contract with Prime Sports Midwest to televise 17 games out-of-market while in-market viewers would be offered the games on pay-per-view through the same revenue sharing agreement with local cable operators that was used for the previous season's playoffs. The price for these games were $9.95 each with an option to purchase the entire package at a reduced rate. Additionally, 25 games were televised on KMSP-TV.

Ownership changes and affiliation with FSN

In 1992, CBS acquired the Midwest Sports Channel, through its purchase of Midwest Communications (which it previously had 47% ownership). For the 1992-93 season MSC once again televised some North Stars games, but the channel lost the broadcast rights permanently when the North Stars relocated to Dallas after the end of the season. MSC expanded its lineup of professional sports events in 1995, after it landed a television contract with the Minnesota Timberwolves to hold the regional cable rights to the team's games for the 95-96 season.

The following year, the Wisconsin Sports Network (a gametime-only network broadcasting Milwaukee Brewers and Bucks games), which had been owned by Time Warner Cable's Milwaukee franchise and Group W (whose corporate parent, Westinghouse, had just merged with CBS), was folded into MSC, giving the network a broader reach throughout the Midwest, in addition to the rights to the Brewers and Bucks contracts, and a sizeable stable of local outdoor programs. In 1997, the Midwest Sports Channel became an affiliate of the recently created Fox Sports Net.

Shortly after completing its merger with CBS, on June 10, 2000, Viacom announced that it would sell the Midwest Sports Channel and Baltimore-based regional sports network Home Team Sports. On July 11, 2000, Comcast acquired the Midwest Sports Channel from CBS. News Corporation, which was a minority owner in the network and wanted to acquire the channel outright, attempted to block the deal,(as it would have been reworked into a Comcast SportsNet), filing a lawsuit on July 21 to stop the sale of MSC and Home Team Sports. On September 7, 2000, as part of a settlement between the two companies, Comcast traded its equity interest in Midwest Sports Channel to News Corporation in exchange for exclusive ownership of Home Team Sports (which subsequently joined Comcast SportsNet as Comcast SportsNet Mid-Atlantic). Through its existing content agreement with the channel, WCCO continued to broadcast a replay of its 10:00 p.m. newscast daily at 4:30 a.m. as an encore until the sale to Fox was finalized.

In 2000, MSC acquired the television rights to the Minnesota Wild, an NHL expansion team which began play that year; the deal was struck by Fox in May shortly before the lawsuit against Comcast was filed as part of its plans to start a Minnesota-based regional sports network. With the acquisition of the Wild broadcasts, MSC adopted FSN-branded graphics, with announcers frequently using the phrase "...live on MSC, Fox Sports Net style" during its game broadcasts.

This culminated in the channel's official rebranding as Fox Sports Net North in April 2001, coinciding with the start of that year's Minnesota Twins season and the opening of American Family Field (Then named Miller Park) as the home stadium of the Milwaukee Brewers; the new branding was heavily promoted on-air, on billboards and on bus advertisements. One side effect to the rebranding were resulting reductions to the network's budget; Fox also let the contracts to some events expire, forcing the network to depend more on programming from FSN's national schedule (such as the National Sports Report and You Gotta See This!).

In October 2003, Minnesota Twins owner Carl Pohlad attempted to launch a competing regional sports network, to be named Victory Sports One, which would broadcast all Twins games as well as local college and high school sport events. The channel was also expected to carry a number of locally produced sports shows, the centerpiece of which would be Kent Hrbek Outdoors. Victory Sports One launched in November 2003, however the effort folded in May 2004 after six months due to financial and cable carriage issues; after VS1 ceased operations, Fox Sports Net North absorbed most of the channel's programming including the television rights to the Twins. As a result, Fox Sports Net launched a new "local fans first" initiative, launching the daily regional news program Minnesota Sports Report and adding regular broadcasts of high school sport events.

In April 2006, still lacking a local news program after CBS Sold the channel (the now-defunct Minnesota Sports Report originated from FSN West and FSN West 2's studios in Downtown Los Angeles), FSN North launched FSN Live, a first-of-its-kind program serving as both a sports news show, and a pre-game and post-game analysis program for the channel's game broadcasts. FSN Live is usually broadcast live and on-location from sports events televised by the channel, though FSN Live originates from the FSN North studios in Minneapolis whenever the focused team is playing on the road.  Regardless of the origin of FSN Live, the pregame show usually features a preview of the game from the announcers and a pregame press conference by the head coach or manager.  Meanwhile, the postgame show includes an interview with the player of the game, postgame analysis from the announcers and the head coach or manager's postgame press conference.

On April 4, 2007, FSN North spun off its Wisconsin subfeed into FSN Wisconsin (now Bally Sports Wisconsin), a separate channel carrying Milwaukee Brewers and Milwaukee Bucks games as well as other events sourced from its former parent channel. Wild broadcasts are available throughout Wisconsin. In 2009, FSN North rebranded as Fox Sports North as part of a network-wide rebranding of the Fox Sports regional networks.

On December 14, 2017, as part of a merger between both companies, The Walt Disney Company announced plans to acquire all 22 regional Fox Sports networks from 21st Century Fox, including YES Network. However, on June 27, 2018, the Justice Department ordered their divestment under antitrust grounds, citing Disney's ownership of ESPN. On May 3, 2019, Sinclair Broadcast Group and Entertainment Studios (through their joint venture, Diamond Holdings) bought Fox Sports Networks from The Walt Disney Company for $10.6 billion. The deal closed on August 22, 2019, thus placing Fox Sports North in common ownership with neighboring Sinclair station WUCW in Minneapolis. On November 17, 2020, Sinclair announced an agreement with casino operator Bally's Corporation to serve as a new naming rights partner for the FSN channels. Sinclair announced the new Bally Sports branding for the channels on January 27, 2021.  On March 31, 2021, coinciding with the 2021 Major League Baseball season, Fox Sports North was rebranded as Bally Sports North, resulting in 18 other Regional Sports Networks renamed Bally Sports in their respective regions.

In the spring of 2021, Bally Sports North aired five Timberwolves games on WUCW, branded as "Bally Sports North Extra". This was the first time since the WFTC deal that any broadcaster regionally aired Timberwolves games over-the-air.

In the spring of 2022, Bally Sports North aired two Twins games and a Wild game on WUCW.

On March 14, 2023, Diamond Sports filed for Chapter 11 Bankruptcy.

Programming
Bally Sports North holds the exclusive regional cable television rights to Major League Baseball from the Minnesota Twins (having aired the team's games since 1989, and exclusive rights since 2011), NBA games from the Minnesota Timberwolves (since 1995), NHL games from the Minnesota Wild (since 2000), and Major League Soccer games from Minnesota United FC (beginning in 2018). They also air WNBA games from the Minnesota Lynx and AHL games from the Iowa Wild as well.  The channel also broadcasts NCAA Division I collegiate sporting events from the Minnesota Golden Gophers and the North Dakota Fighting Hawks, as well as college hockey games from the National Collegiate Hockey Conference schools the Minnesota Duluth Bulldogs and the St. Cloud State Huskies.  Finally Bally Sports North airs Minnesota Vikings related material though it is limited to a pregame show airing on NFL Sundays a couple of hours before the game as well as replays of preseason action.

Bally Sports North also distributes some of its programming to Bally Sports Wisconsin, including a reduced schedule of Minnesota Wild games, most NCHC hockey games and competitions sanctioned by the Wisconsin Interscholastic Athletic Association (WIAA). Due to blackout restrictions imposed by Major League Baseball and the NBA, Bally Sports North is not permitted to broadcast Milwaukee Brewers and Milwaukee Bucks games televised by Bally Sports Wisconsin.

Other Programming
Fox Sports North also aired outdoor programming under the FSN Outdoors banner.  This included fishing and hunting action.  Also included is a portion of the national schedule which includes the World Poker Tour as well as repeats of earlier national events on other Fox Sports branded channels.

Bally Sports North Extra
Bally Sports North operates Bally Sports North Extra as a 24-hour full-time HD channel that is used to carry additional programming including overflow live sports programming. Most providers carry the channel full-time, though some opt to carry it as a game-time only channel. Beginning in April 2021, Bally Sports North has been using Sinclair-owned WUCW as a third overflow channel to accommodate several dates when all three professional sports teams are scheduled to play at the same time. These broadcasts are branded as  Bally Sports Extra on The CW Twin Cities. For subscribers in the team's territories unable to access WUCW, these games will be offered on the Bally Sports app.

On-air staff

Current

Minnesota Timberwolves
 Michael Grady – play-by-play announcer
 Jim Petersen – analyst
 Katie Storm - courtside reporter
 Marney Gellner - pregame/postgame host
Rebekkah Brunson - pregame/postgame analyst
Quincy Lewis - pregame/postgame analyst
Kevin Lynch - pregame/postgame analyst

Minnesota Twins

 Dick Bremer – play-by-play announcer
 Chris Vosters – fill-in play-by-play announcer
 Justin Morneau — analyst 
 Jack Morris – analyst
 LaTroy Hawkins — analyst
 Anthony LaPanta - pregame/postgame host & fill-in play-by-play announcer
 Roy Smalley – pregame/postgame analyst
 Glen Perkins - pregame/postgame analyst
 Marney Gellner - on-field reporter
 Audra Martin - on-field reporter

Minnesota Wild
 Anthony LaPanta – play-by-play announcer
 Ryan Carter – analyst
 Kevin Gorg - studio/rinkside analyst
 Wes Walz - studio analyst
 Tom Chorske - studio analyst
  Audra Martin - studio host

University of Minnesota Hockey

 Doug McLeod - play-by-play announcer
 Ben Clymer - analyst

Minnesota Lynx
 Marney Gellner - Play-by-Play announcer
 Lea B Olson - analyst

Minnesota United FC
 Callum Williams - play-by-play
 Kyndra de St. Aubin - analyst 
 Charlie Beattie - sideline reporter/analyst

Minnesota Vikings
(Preseason only)
 Paul Allen - play-by-play
 Pete Bercich - analyst
 Ben Leber - sideline reporter

Iowa Wild
Joe O'Donnell – play-by-play

Other
 Ann Carroll – host/reporter

Former
 Tom Hanneman – studio host (deceased)
 Bert Blyleven - Twins analyst
 Jamie Hersch - Twins/Wild studio host (now at NHL Network)
 Greg Coleman - Vikings sideline reporter (retired)
 Dave Benz - Timberwolves play-by-play announcer

References

External links
 

Fox Sports Networks
SportsChannel
Television stations in Minneapolis–Saint Paul
Television channels and stations established in 1989
1989 establishments in Minnesota
Companies that filed for Chapter 11 bankruptcy in 2023
Former CBS Corporation subsidiaries
Bally Sports